Hindlip or Hinlip is a village and civil parish  north east of Worcester, in the Wychavon district, in the county of Worcestershire, England. In 2011 the parish had a population of 180. The parish touches Tibberton, Martin Hussingtree, Salwarpe, Oddingley, Warndon and North Claines.

Features 
There are 15 listed buildings in Hindlip. Hindlip Hall, a stately home originally built in 1563, rebuilt in 1820 following its destruction by fire is the headquarters of the West Mercia Police. St James's Church is a 15th-century parish church which is no longer supported by the Church of England (since 1997), but is now the church for the constabulary.

History 
The name "Hindlip" means 'Hind leap'. Hindlip was recorded in the Domesday Book as Hindelep. Hindlip was "Hindehlep" in the 10th century, "Hundeslep" in the 12th century, "Hindelupe" in the 13h century and Henlipp in the 16th century. On the 22nd of December 1886 Upper and Lower Smite Houses, a part of Warndon parish was transferred to the parish. The transferred area contained 5 houses in 1891. On the 1st of April 1952 18 acres were transferred to the parish from North Claines and 5 acres were transferred to Warndon. The parish was historically in the Oswaldslow hundred. Hindlip was possibly a deserted medieval village.

References 

Villages in Worcestershire
Civil parishes in Worcestershire
Wychavon